The First Kiss is a 1928 German silent comedy film directed by Carl Lamac and starring Anny Ondra, Eugen Burg and Viola Garden.

The film's art direction was by Carl Ludwig Kirmse and Heinrich Richter.

Cast
 Anny Ondra as Anny Cord
 Eugen Burg as William Cord, Getreidekönig, ihr Vater
 Viola Garden as Bessie, seine Sekretärin
 Hilde Jennings as Margit, Annys Freundin
 Werner Pittschau as Walter Stolz, ein Musiker
 Gaston Jacquet as Harry Peters
 Teddy Bill as Präsident des Anny-Cord-Clubs
 Mikhail Rasumny as Ein Hoteldirektor & Harry, Peters Chauffeur
 Josef Rovenský as Kuhlmann
 Mia Pankau as Eine Soubrette, seine Freundin
 Hubert von Meyerinck as James Twist

References

Bibliography
 Grange, William. Cultural Chronicle of the Weimar Republic. Scarecrow Press, 2008.

External links

1928 films
Films of the Weimar Republic
Films directed by Karel Lamač
German silent feature films
German black-and-white films
1928 comedy films
Films scored by Paul Dessau
German comedy films
Silent comedy films
1920s German films
1920s German-language films